Marcelo Lopes de Faria  or simply  Marcelo Lopes  (born 17 May 1975) is a Brazilian football defender,

He previously played for União São João, Fortaleza in the Campeonato Brasileiro Série A. and Potiguar de Mossoró in the Campeonato Potiguar

References

External links
 CBF

1975 births
Living people
Brazilian footballers
Guarani FC players
Mirassol Futebol Clube players
Mogi Mirim Esporte Clube players
Fortaleza Esporte Clube players
União São João Esporte Clube players
Esporte Clube Santo André players
Esporte Clube XV de Novembro (Piracicaba) players
Sportspeople from Paraná (state)
Association football defenders